Sequenza (Italian for "sequence") is the name borne by fourteen compositions for solo instruments or voice by Luciano Berio. The pieces, some of which call for extended techniques, are:

Sequenza I (1958; rev. 1992) for flute
Sequenza II (1963) for harp
Sequenza III (1965) for female voice
Sequenza IV (1965) for piano
Sequenza V (1966) for trombone
Sequenza VI (1967) for viola
Sequenza VII (1969/2000) for oboe (reworked as Sequenza VIIb for soprano saxophone in 2000)
Sequenza VIII (1976) for violin
Sequenza IX (1980) for clarinet (reworked 1981 as Sequenza IXb for alto saxophone, and 1980 as Sequenza IXc for bass clarinet)
Sequenza X (1984) for trumpet and piano resonance
Sequenza XI (1987) for guitar
Sequenza XII (1995) for bassoon
Sequenza XIII (1995) for accordion
Sequenza XIV (2002) for cello (reworked in 2004 by Stefano Scodanibbio as Sequenza XIVb for double bass)

Several of these pieces became the basis of larger works: 

 Sequenza II, with the addition of extra instrumental parts around the original solo, became Chemins I.
 Sequenza VI developed into Chemins II, Chemins IIb, Chemins IIc and Chemins III.
 Sequenza VII became Chemins IV.
 Sequenza XI became Chemins V.
 Sequenza X became Kol-Od, also known as Chemins VI.
 Sequenza IXb became Récit, also known as Chemins VII.
 Sequenza VIII became Corale.

Conversely, Sequenza IX grew out of a piece for clarinet and electronics (later withdrawn), originally known as Chemins V; NB it is not the same as the work with the same title which originates from Sequenza XI.

References

Compositions by Luciano Berio
Cycles (music)

Compositions that use extended techniques